Alletorphine (INN; M-218, R&S-218-M), or N-allylnoretorphine, is an opioid analgesic of the oripavine series which was never marketed.

See also 
 Etorphine

References 

Phenols
Tertiary alcohols
Analgesics
4,5-Epoxymorphinans
Opioids
Allylamines